Risto Rosendahl (born 23 November 1979) is a Finnish speed skater. He competed at the 2002 Winter Olympics and the 2006 Winter Olympics.

References

External links
 

1979 births
Living people
Finnish male speed skaters
Olympic speed skaters of Finland
Speed skaters at the 2002 Winter Olympics
Speed skaters at the 2006 Winter Olympics
People from Harjavalta
Sportspeople from Satakunta